Camille Guaty (born June 28, 1976) is an American film and television actress. She is known for several roles: as Daisy in Gotta Kick It Up! (2002), for playing Maricruz Delgado, Sucre's girlfriend, in Prison Break (2005–2007), and as Walter O'Brien's sister, Megan, a recurring role on the CBS series Scorpion (2014–2015).

Early life
Guaty was born in Sunnyvale, California of Cuban and Puerto Rican descent. Her mother's side of the family is originally from the Canary Islands.

She attended a summer program at the Royal Academy of Dramatic Art in London and studied at Boston University. She has lived in California, New Jersey and New York City.

Career

Singing
Camille auditioned for Popstars, a reality TV show that aired on the WB Network in 2000. She made it to the L.A. Workshop that included only the best 26 contestants. In the end, Camille was one of ten semi-finalists and eventually the last contestant not to win a spot as part of the winning girl group Eden's Crush.

Acting
In 2002, Guaty was the lead in the movie Gotta Kick It Up!, a Disney Channel Original movie. She was the leading role in the short-lived TV series The Help with Mindy Cohn, Megan Fox, and Antonio Sabato Jr.

In 2004, Guaty was the leading lady,  Maggie Moreno, in the movie 30 Days Until I'm Famous. She also starred in Crossing Jordan as Det. Luisa Santana in the episodes "Blue Moon" and "Family Affair".

In 2005, Guaty had a recurring role Maricruz Delgado, the girlfriend of Fernando Sucre, in Prison Break. She starred as Franny Rios in ABC's The Nine, and played the role of Alex in The Brothers Garcia.

Guaty was cast as recurring character Piper Nielsen, a new Montecito concierge, in 2007 on NBC's Las Vegas. Guaty has also appeared in Cupid and Ghosts of Girlfriends Past. She appeared in a 2011 episode of The Chicago Code as Elena, as the fiancée of the main character, Jarek Wysocki. She had a recurring role in the TV show Scorpion as Megan O'Brien, the older sister of main character Walter O'Brien.

Personal life
Guaty is married to British songwriter Sy Rhys Kaye. In August 2019, Guaty announced her pregnancy with the couple's first child with the help of an egg donor. Their son was born in October 2019.

Filmography

Film

Television

References

External links

 
 Camille Guaty at Filmbug

1976 births
American television actresses
Hispanic and Latino American actresses
Living people
American people of Puerto Rican descent
American people of Canarian descent
Actresses from California
21st-century American actresses
American entertainers of Cuban descent
American expatriates in Spain